Deyan Todorov (born 29 January 1983) is a Bulgarian alpine skier. He competed in the men's slalom at the 2006 Winter Olympics.

References

1983 births
Living people
Bulgarian male alpine skiers
Olympic alpine skiers of Bulgaria
Alpine skiers at the 2006 Winter Olympics
Sportspeople from Sofia